Argyle is a town in Clinch County, Georgia, United States. As of the 2020 census, the city had a population of 190.

History
The community takes its name from Fort Argyle, near Savannah. A post office called Argyle has been in operation since 1882. The town was incorporated in 1901.

Geography

Demographics

As of the census of 2000, there were 151 people, 49 households, and 39 families residing in the town. The racial makeup of the town was 73.51% White, 19.87% African American, 2.65% Native American, and 3.97% from two or more races. Hispanic or Latino of any race were 2.65% of the population.

There were 49 households, out of which 40.8% had children under the age of 18 living with them, 63.3% were married couples living together, 14.3% had a female householder with no husband present, and 20.4% were non-families. 20.4% of all households were made up of individuals, and 8.2% had someone living alone who was 65 years of age or older. The average household size was 3.08 and the average family size was 3.56.

In the town, the population was spread out, with 31.1% under the age of 18, 13.2% from 18 to 24, 31.8% from 25 to 44, 16.6% from 45 to 64, and 7.3% who were 65 years of age or older. The median age was 28 years. For every 100 females, there were 86.4 males. For every 100 females age 18 and over, there were 85.7 males.

The median income for a household in the town was $26,250, and the median income for a family was $30,250. Males had a median income of $25,000 versus $16,250 for females. The per capita income for the town was $7,672. There were 37.8% of families and 32.5% of the population living below the poverty line, including 49.0% of under eighteens and none of those over 64.

Climate
The climate in this area is characterized by relatively high temperatures and evenly distributed precipitation throughout the year.  According to the Köppen Climate Classification system, Argyle has a Humid subtropical climate, abbreviated "Cfa" on climate maps.

References

Towns in Clinch County, Georgia
Towns in Georgia (U.S. state)